Cyril Langevine Jr. (born August 16, 1998) is a Guyanese-American professional basketball player for Lavrio of the Greek Basket League. He played college basketball for the Rhode Island Rams.

High school career
Raised in East Orange, New Jersey, Langevine attended The Patrick School. He averaged 7.6 points per game as a junior. As a senior, Langevine averaged 10 points, seven rebounds, and two blocks per game. In September 2015, he committed to play college basketball at Rhode Island over offers from Fairleigh Dickinson, Duquesne, Quinnipiac, Robert Morris, George Mason, St. Francis (Pa.), St. Bonaventure and Buffalo.

College career
As a freshman, Langevine averaged 3.2 points and 4.5 rebounds per game on a team that reached the NCAA Tournament. He was limited by injuries during his sophomore year and averaged 6.1 points and 5.8 rebounds per game off the bench. On March 1, 2019, he scored a career-high 26 points in a 72–70 overtime victory against Dayton. Langevine averaged 14.7 points, 9.9 rebounds, and 1.4 blocks per game as a junior, shooting 56.7 percent from the field. He was named to the Second Team All-Atlantic 10. As a senior, Langevine averaged 10.1 points, 10.3 rebounds and two blocks per game. He surpassed the 1,000 career point mark shortly before the season was ended due to the COVID-19 pandemic.

Professional career
On September 10, 2020, Langevine signed his first professional contract with Jämtland Basket of the Swedish Basketligan. He averaged 14.3 points, 11.9 rebounds, 1.2 assists and 1.8 blocks per game. Langevine was named to the First Team All-Basketligan and helped the team reach the semifinals. 

On July 15, 2021, he signed with Śląsk Wrocław of the Polish Basketball League. Langevine averaged 9.2 points, 6.5 rebounds, 1.1 assists, and 1.1 blocks per game. On January 28, 2022, he signed with Wilki Morskie Szczecin of the Polish Basketball League.

On June 26, 2022, he signed with Mitteldeutscher BC of the German Basketball Bundesliga. On August 31, 2022, his contract has been terminated after the surgery and related to needed long recovery period.

On December 9, 2022, Langevine signed with Greek club Lavrio for the rest of the season, replacing Al Durham.

References

External links
Rhode Island Rams bio

1998 births
Living people
American expatriate basketball people in Germany
American expatriate basketball people in Greece
American expatriate basketball people in Poland
American expatriate basketball people in Sweden
American men's basketball players
Basketball players from New Jersey
Guyanese men's basketball players
Lavrio B.C. players
Power forwards (basketball)
Rhode Island Rams men's basketball players
Śląsk Wrocław basketball players
Sportspeople from East Orange, New Jersey
The Patrick School alumni